Juan Manuel Acuña Romero (16 October 1921 – 5 December 1989) was a Chilean footballer. He played in six matches for the Chile national football team in 1947. He was also part of Chile's squad for the 1947 South American Championship.

References

External links
 

1921 births
1989 deaths
Chilean footballers
Chile international footballers
Place of birth missing
Association football midfielders
Audax Italiano footballers